Chashma-Ayub Mausoleum is located near the Samani Mausoleum, in Bukhara, Uzbekistan. Its name means Job's well, due to the legend in which Job (Ayub) visited this place and made a well by striking the ground with his staff. The water of this well is still pure and is considered healing. The current building was constructed during the reign of Timur and features a Khwarazm-style conical dome uncommon in Bukhara.

Site description
Chashma-Ayub Mausoleum is in the middle of a small, ancient cemetery. The construction suffered some losses, but the preserved parts represent a combination of a harmonious entrance portal, and adjoining it are the remains of the western curtain wall.

The construction layout of the portal is in a traditional pattern, made up in the form of two pylons, forming the niche overlapped by the semi vault. The II-shaped frame, the inside of which forms the obverse surface, tympanum, and ktoba, is finished with an inscription above the lancet arch. The northern part of the niche portal is a limited gable wall with a doorway. From the western end the portal is adjoined by a deep brick wall that measures 5.9 m, of which the western portion has been lost. The wall is in the form of a trapezoid with a large base. The central room is overlapped by the tent-peaked dome. Except for the proportions of the construction, this monument has well-considered and perfectly executed decoration, the basic part of which is concentrated on the portal. The most effective place in the general composition of the decoration is ktoba, filled with Arabic inscriptions on a background of botanical ornamentation. The portal frame on the external contour is marked by the II-shaped zone, strengthened by girikh from intertwining octahedrons, made of terracotta bricks. Glazed inserts in turquoise fill the central octahedral sockets. A tape borders the frame and ktoba. The historical value of the monument consists of the exact dating written on ktoba (1208–1209 .A.D.) or the 605th year of the Muslim Calendar.

History

World Heritage Status
This site was added to the UNESCO World Heritage Tentative List on 18 January 2008, in the Cultural category.

References

Mausoleums in Uzbekistan
Uzbekistani culture
World Heritage Tentative List
Bukhara